Edith Kingdon Gould Martin (August 20, 1920 – August 17, 2004) was an American socialite, linguist, actress, and poet.

Birth
She was the daughter of financier Kingdon Gould Sr., granddaughter of financier George Jay Gould, and great-granddaughter of Jay Gould the robber baron. She appeared as an actress in the 1946 Broadway production of Agatha Christie's play Hidden Horizon.

Poet
Time writes on December 24, 1934:
Out just in time to make a fine Christmas present for her schoolmates at Miss Hewitt's Classes was a thin, blue & white book of Poems by Edith Kingdon Gould, 14, great-granddaughter of Jay Gould. On the day it was published Manhattan newshawks called at the Goulds' Manhattan penthouse, found the butler and Miss Edith, a well-poised girl with bangs and saucer eyes, at home. Said Poet Gould. "I suppose I must get used to this if I am going to be any good with my verse." Thereupon she rattled solemnly: "I have been writing poetry since I was 6. It's funny that I should have loved poetry, isn't it? Most of the girls I know really loathe it. ... I like horseback riding, swimming, and tennis, but I am poor at tennis. ... I like boys all right, but I don't like them my own age. They seem so stupid. ... I think it's very silly of Roosevelt to tax the rich and give it to the unemployed." Miss Gould posed for newscameramen, then ushered her callers to the elevator. "You know," said she "I will get 10 cents for every copy that's sold." Best of her 37 verses. Author Gould likes "When Tomorrow," written on her 14th birthday last August:
When tomorrow has become today
I will be one year older, people say.
When today has joined the endless train
Of yesterdays that came and went again,
This past year with its wild desires,
Hopes unrealized that youth inspires,
Dreams that became deceptions, rapture, all
Will have passed far out beyond recall.
Year that I have lived! Thoughts that were my own!
Dying in the dead of night, alone.
Will I, too, sometime have slipped their way
When tomorrow has become today?

Navy
In October 1942 she joined the WAVES as an apprentice seaman and trained in Madison, Wisconsin. She graduated as an Ensign from the Naval Reserve Midshipmen's School in Northampton, Massachusetts in April 1944. Later she was promoted to a Lieutenant. She spoke five languages.

Marriage and children
She married Isaiah Guyman "Guy" Martin Jr. (1911-2014) when he was age 35. He was a Navy lieutenant and a lawyer in Judge Advocate General's Corps. They married in Manhattan in October 1946. They had four children: Isaiah Guyman Martin III, Jason Gould Martin, Christopher Kingdon Martin, and Edith Maria Theodosia Burr Martin.

Death
She died on August 17, 2004 in the Catskills.

References

External links
 
 

1920 births
2004 deaths
Linguists from the United States
Women linguists
American socialites
American stage actresses
American women poets
Edith Kingdon Gould
20th-century linguists
United States Navy officers
WAVES personnel